There have been several Army cricket teams to have played first-class cricket:

British Army cricket team
Services cricket team
Nepal Army Club
New Zealand Army cricket team
South Africa Army cricket team 
Sri Lanka Army Sports Club cricket team